Saunders Beach is a coastal town and suburb of Townsville in the City of Townsville, Queensland, Australia.

Geography 

The suburb is bounded to the north and east by the Coral Sea and to the west by Althaus Creek (also known as Deep Creek).

The town is situated just south-east of the mouth of Althaus Creek.

History 
Saunders Beach was originally part of the Parish of Jalloonda, but was established as separate locality on 17 March 1984. Its status was changed to be a suburb on  28 February 2003.

In 2004 a Beach Management Plan was put into place by Thuringowa City Council, to establish causes of erosion and help manage any future detriment to the beach by means of both natural and unnatural erosion.

A high proportion of the Saunders Beach population are aged in the 45-64 age bracket, with approximately 17.5% of the population aged between 45-54, and 11.3% aged between 55-64.

In September 2021, a  crocodile was captured in Althaus Creek having been seen hanging around the boat ramps and pontoons. Wildlife officers believed that fish scraps improperly discarded by fishermen had attracted the crocodile and urged people to correctly dispose of such material in bins or taking it away.

Education 
There are no schools in Saunders Beach. The nearest government primary school is Bluewater State School in neighbouring Bluewater to the west. The nearest government secondary school is Northern Beaches State High School in Deeragun to the south-west.

Amenities 
Saunders Beach Community Centre is on the western corner of Saunders Beach Road and Atoll Street. Saunders Beach Rural Fire Station is at the community centre. The Townsville City Council operate a mobile library service which visits the community centre every second Wednesday afternoon.

There are two boat ramps in the suburb, both managed by the Townsville City Council, at:

 Boat Ramp Road, on the south bank of Althaus Creek
 Purono Parkway, also on the south bank of the creek but further upstream

Attractions 
Saunders Beach is a popular local tourist destination, the northern end of which offers free, limited camping reserves. Access to Althaus Creek is provided by means of a boat ramp, and other community facilities include a community centre, and numerous parks with children's playground equipment.

References

External links
 University of Queensland: Queensland Places: Saunders Beach

Suburbs of Townsville